Colorado state elections in 2020 were held on Tuesday, November 3, 2020. The deadline to register and receive a ballot by mail in Colorado was October 26, 2020. Voters may register in person and vote or pick up a ballot at Voter Service Centers October 19 through 7 p.m. November 3, 2020. Colorado exclusively used a vote-by-mail system, although voters may choose to vote in person at Voter Service and Polling Centers (VSPCs).

In addition to the U.S. presidential race, Colorado voters voted in the U.S. Senate, U.S. House, state executive offices, State Senate, State House, state Supreme Court, Appellate courts, local judges, state ballot measures, and municipal elections.

Federal elections

President of the United States 

Colorado has 9 electoral votes in the Electoral College. Nominees for the presidential election included Donald Trump, Joe Biden, and Jo Jorgensen. Joe Biden won the popular vote with 55%, winning 9 pledged electoral votes.

United States Senate 

Incumbent Republican Senator Cory Gardner sought reelection against Democratic former Governor John Hickenlooper in the general election.  John Hickenlooper won the election with 54% of the popular vote, making it a gain for the Democratic Party from the Republican Party.

United States House of Representatives

Coloradans voted for seven U.S. Representatives, one from each of the state's seven congressional districts. No seats changed hands, the Democrats winning 4 seats and the Republicans winning 3 seats.

State elections

Colorado Executive Offices 
Six state executive offices are up for election in Colorado: 3 seats for the State board of education, and 3 seats for the State board of regents.

Colorado Senate 

The Colorado State Senate had 18 seats out of 35 that were up for election in the general election. The Democratic Party retained control of the Senate, gaining the 27th Senate district from the Republican Party, strengthening their majority by one seat.

Colorado House of Representatives 

The Colorado House had all 65 seats up for election in the general election. The Democratic Party retained control of the House, gaining the 38th district from the Republican Party while losing the 47th district to the Republicans, resulting in no net seat change. The resulting composition was 41 Democrats and 24 Republicans.

Colorado Supreme Court 
There are two judges whose terms will expire on January 11, 2021 and their seats were up for retention election in the general election. These judges were Melissa Hart and Carlos Armando Samour Jr. Both of them were retained as judges.

Appellate Courts 
There are two Colorado Court of Appeals justices whose terms will expire on January 11, 2021 and their seats were up for retention election in the general election. These judges were Craig Welling and Ted C. Tow. Both of them were retained as justices.

Colorado Ballot Measures

General election

Amendments 

Amendments C and 76 require 55% of voters to pass as they add to the Colorado Constitution.

Propositions

Polling 
Amendment B

Proposition 113

Proposition 114

Proposition 115

Proposition 116

Proposition 118

Notes

See also 
Politics of Colorado
 Colorado Democratic Party
 Colorado Republican Party
 Political party strength in Colorado
 Elections in Colorado
 Bilingual elections requirement for Colorado (per Voting Rights Act Amendments of 2006)
Government of Colorado

Reference

Further reading

External links 
 
 
 
 
  (State affiliate of the U.S. League of Women Voters)
 

 
Colorado